Laura Ross is a Canadian politician. She was elected to represent the electoral district of Regina Qu'Appelle Valley in the Legislative Assembly of Saskatchewan in the 2007 election, having previously run unsuccessfully in the electoral district of Regina Douglas Park in the 2003 election. Ross was re-elected in the 2011 election, and since then has been re-elected twice more in the riding of Regina Rochdale. She is a member of the Saskatchewan Party. In July 2010, Ross was appointed Minister for Government Services.

Biography 
Laura Ross was born in Yorkton, Saskatchewan. Raised on her family's farm, Ross attained a Bachelor of Arts degree majoring in geography and sociology from the University of Regina before entering the workforce. Ross, along with her husband Terry, were farmers before entering the catering business as a self-employed person. After exiting the world of catering, Ross moved into residential real estate, working in this field for over twenty years.

Prior to her entrance into politics, Ross worked in the community, serving at various times in roles such as Chair of the Board of Directors of the Regina Pioneer Village, a large care facility for senior citizens in Regina. Ross has also been involved in women's rights organisations, serving in executive positions on the Regina Council of Women, the Saskatchewan Council of Women, and later the Canadian Federation of University Women. Today, Ross involves herself in the community at various times by organising fundraisers for organisations such as the Salvation Army.

In the 2007 Saskatchewan provincial election, Ross won the electoral district of Regina Qu'Appelle Valley for the Saskatchewan Party with a slim plurality - she won 4324 votes (42.55%), with second place incumbent Mark Wartman winning 4125 votes (40.6%). Ross had previously attempted to win the constituency of Regina Douglas Park in the 2003 election, but placed second after then Member for Regina Victoria Harry Van Mulligen.

Cabinet positions

References 

Saskatchewan Party MLAs
Women MLAs in Saskatchewan
Living people
People from Yorkton
Politicians from Regina, Saskatchewan
Members of the Executive Council of Saskatchewan
University of Regina alumni
21st-century Canadian politicians
21st-century Canadian women politicians
Women government ministers of Canada
Year of birth missing (living people)